Advanced Helicopter Training is the last phase of flight school for Navy and Marine Corps helicopter pilots.  Training is accomplished at NAS Whiting Field in Milton, Florida.  All training is done in Bell TH-57 Sea Rangers.  Advanced training is approximately six months long, and is divided into ten phases:

Ground school: aircraft systems, local course rules, emergency procedures
Familiarization: hovering, basic helicopter maneuvers
Tactics: confined-area landings, external load operations, high-speed landings
Trans-fams: familiarization in the instrument capable TH-57C model
Basic instruments (BIs): common instrument scans
Radio instruments (RIs): instrument approaches, basic instrument navigation
Visual/instrument navigation: cross-country navigation
Low-level navigation: visual navigation below 500 feet AGL
Formation: section formation maneuvers
Night familiarization/NVGs

Three squadrons perform advanced helicopter training: HT-8 Eightballers, HT-18 Vigilant Eagles and HT-28 Hellions.  Training is also done for the United States Coast Guard and for the navies and marines of several allied countries, including Italy, Spain, and Germany.

United States naval aviation
United States Coast Guard Aviation